The  is a limited express train service for commuters on the Chūō Rapid Line operated by East Japan Railway Company (JR East). The train operates on weekdays only. All seats are reserved on this train.

Prior to 16 March 2019, this train operated as the Chūō Liner (中央ライナー), which was a limited-stop reserved-seat "Home Liner" service. Since 16 March 2019, the Chūō Liner has been upgraded to limited express status and become known as the Hachiōji.

Service outline

Current services

Morning

 Hachiōji 2: Hachiōji to Tokyo
 Hachiōji 4: Hachiōji to Tokyo

Evening

Hachiōji 1: Tokyo to Hachiōji
Hachiōji 3: Tokyo to Hachiōji
Hachiōji 5: Tokyo to Hachiōji
Hachiōji 7: Tokyo to Hachiōji
Hachiōji 9: Tokyo to Hachiōji
Hachiōji 11: Tokyo to Hachiōji

As Chūō Liner

Morning

 Chūō Liner 2: Hachiōji to Tokyo
 Chūō Liner 4: Takao to Tokyo

Evening

 Chūō Liner 1: Tokyo to Takao
 Chūō Liner 3: Tokyo to Takao
 Chūō Liner 5: Tokyo to Takao
 Chūō Liner 7: Tokyo to Hachiōji
 Chūō Liner 9: Tokyo to Takao

History 
JR East announced a new timetable revision which took effect from March 2019 onwards. It announced the discontinuation of the Chūō Liner and the Ōme Liner, which was replaced by two new limited express services, the Hachiōji (はちおうじ) and the Ōme (おうめ) respectively. The Hachiōji operates in a similar pattern as the former Chūō Liner, with two Tokyo-bound trains during the morning rush, and six Hachiōji-bound trains during the evening rush. With this, a new ticketing system is now implemented, in which limited express tickets can be purchased in advance, unlike the Liner tickets which can only be bought on the day of boarding.

Rolling stock

Current rolling stock 

E353 series (since March 16, 2019)

Past rolling stock
183 series 9-car EMUs (from March 16, 1991 until March 16, 2008)
E351 series 12-car EMUs (since March 15, 2008 until March 16, 2018)
E257 series 9- or 11-car EMUs (since July 1, 2002 until March 15, 2019)

Formations

Current formation

Hachiōji E353 series

Past formations

Chūō Liner E257 series

Chūō Liner E351 series

See also
Ōme (train), formerly Ōme Liner, a similar limited express service
 List of named passenger trains of Japan

References 
 JR Timetable, March 2008 issue
 "2008 年3 月ダイヤ改正について" JR East Hachiōji Branch news release, 20 December 2007 

East Japan Railway Company
Named passenger trains of Japan
Railway services introduced in 1991
1991 establishments in Japan

ja:はちおうじ